The Hatton Baronetcy, of Long Stanton in the County of Cambridge, was a title in the Baronetage of England. It was created on 5 July 1641 for Thomas Hatton, Member of Parliament for Corfe Castle, Malmesbury and Stamford. The title became extinct on the death of the tenth Baronet in 1812.

Hatton baronets, of Long Stanton (1641)
Sir Thomas Hatton, 1st Baronet (c. 1583–1658)
Sir Thomas Hatton, 2nd Baronet (died 1682)
Sir Christopher Hatton, 3rd Baronet (died 1683)
Sir Thomas Hatton, 4th Baronet (died 1685)
Sir Christopher Hatton, 5th Baronet (died 1720)
Sir Thomas Hatton, 6th Baronet (died 1733)
Sir John Hatton, 7th Baronet (died 1740)
Sir Thomas Hatton, 8th Baronet (1728–1787)
Sir John Hatton, 9th Baronet (died 1811)
Sir Thomas Dingley Hatton, 10th Baronet (c. 1771–1812)

References

Extinct baronetcies in the Baronetage of England